Conaway is an unincorporated community in Buchanan County, Virginia, United States. Conaway had a post office until July 9, 1988.

References

Unincorporated communities in Buchanan County, Virginia
Unincorporated communities in Virginia